Ilias Polimos (born 1 September 1995) is a Greek professional footballer who plays as a right-back.

References

1995 births
Living people
Greek footballers
Greece youth international footballers
Super League Greece players
Football League (Greece) players
Super League Greece 2 players
Panionios F.C. players
Acharnaikos F.C. players
Panthrakikos F.C. players
Panachaiki F.C. players
Ionikos F.C. players
Niki Volos F.C. players
Xanthi F.C. players
Association football defenders
Footballers from Kalamata